Atle Armas Gabriel Asanti (until 1937 Aschan; 31 May  1905 - 3 January  1992) was a Finnish diplomat and lawyer.

Early life 
Asanti became an undergraduate student in 1925. In 1931, he completed a bachelor's degree in law. Asanti earned a Master in Law in 1934. He went to work at the Ministry for Foreign Affairs that year.

Career 
Assanti worked as an assistant to the delegations in Stockholm, Berlin, and Moscow in the 1930s.

Post-war, Asanti served as secretary of the Foreign Ministry and later as a Division Chief from 1957-1959 as well as the head of the Legal Department.

Asanti was appointed Finland's ambassador to the United Arab Republic from 1959 to 1962 and served as Ambassador to Beirut and Khartoum 1959–1962. He was Envoy to Addis Abeba  between 1959–1962.

He was ambassador in Prague 1962–1972  and Tirana 1962–1971. Asanti retired in 1972.

Asanti was a member of the Board of Directors of Finnish Foreign Trade Association and International Law Association's Finnish Department.

In 1947 he received the title  of the Counselor's Counsel; then in 1959 the title of the Sovereign Special Ambassador.

References

20th-century Finnish lawyers
1905 births
1992 deaths
People from Turku and Pori Province (Grand Duchy of Finland)
People from Turku
Ambassadors of Finland to Egypt
Ambassadors of Finland to Syria
Ambassadors of Finland to Lebanon
Ambassadors of Finland to Ethiopia
Ambassadors of Finland to Sudan
Ambassadors of Finland to Czechoslovakia
Ambassadors of Finland to Albania